1957 Angara is a stony Eos asteroid from the outer regions of the asteroid belt, approximately  in diameter. It was discovered on 1 April 1970, by Soviet astronomer Lyudmila Chernykh at the Crimean Astrophysical Observatory in Nauchnyj, and named after the Siberian Angara River.

Classification and orbit 

Angara is a member of the Eos family, well known for mostly being of a silicaceous composition. It orbits the Sun in the outer main-belt at a distance of 2.8–3.2 AU once every 5 years and 3 months (1,906 days). Its orbit has an eccentricity of 0.06 and an inclination of 11° with respect to the ecliptic. A first precovery was taken at Goethe Link Observatory in 1956, extending the body's observation arc by 14 years prior to its official discovery observation at Nauchnyj.

Naming 

This minor planet was named for the over 1000-mile long Siberian Angara River that drains Lake Baikal. The official  was published by the Minor Planet Center on 30 June 1977.

Physical characteristics 

In December 1983, a rotational lightcurve of Angara was obtained from photometric observations by American astronomer Richard Binzel. Lightcurve analysis gave a well-define rotation period of 3.67 hours with a brightness amplitude of 0.52 magnitude, indicative of a non-spheroidal shape. Binzel also classified the body as a stony S-type asteroid.

According to the surveys carried out by the Japanese Akari satellite and NASA's Wide-field Infrared Survey Explorer with its subsequent NEOWISE mission, Angara measures between 17.907 and 30.41 kilometers in diameter and its surface has an albedo between 0.055 and 0.1438. The Collaborative Asteroid Lightcurve Link assumes a standard albedo for stony Eoan asteroids of 0.14 – taken from the family's largest member and namesake, 221 Eos – and derives a diameter of 18.38 kilometers with an absolute magnitude of 11.43.

References

External links 
 Asteroid Lightcurve Database (LCDB), query form (info )
 Dictionary of Minor Planet Names, Google books
 Asteroids and comets rotation curves, CdR – Observatoire de Genève, Raoul Behrend
 Discovery Circumstances: Numbered Minor Planets (1)-(5000) – Minor Planet Center
 
 

001957
Discoveries by Lyudmila Chernykh
Named minor planets
19700401